Andrija Žižić (born 14 January 1980) is a Croatian former professional basketball player and executive. Standing of 2.07 m (6 ft 9 ½ in) tall, he played at both the power forward and center positions. He is currently the sporting director for Cibona of the ABA League and the Croatian League.

Professional career
In his career, some of the teams that Žižić played with were: Omiš, Solin, Split, Cibona Zagreb, FC Barcelona, Olympiacos, Panathinaikos. He won two Croatian League championships (2003, 2004), and in the 2002–03 season, he was the top rebounder in the Adriatic League (8.2 rebounds per game). He won the Greek League championship and the Greek Cup in the 2007–08 season.

On 17 July 2008, Žižić signed a two-year contract with the Turkish team Galatasaray Cafe Crown. On 15 January 2009, he left Galatasaray, and signed with the Spanish club CAI Zaragoza, for the rest of the season. On June 24, 2010, he signed with ASVEL Lyon-Villeurbanne in France. On 28 February 2011, he left ASVEL, and signed with Cedevita Zagreb, for the rest of the season.

In the summer of 2011, he returned to Cibona Zagreb. On 12 December 2013, he parted ways with Cibona. On 3 January 2014, he signed with Astana. On 12 February 2014, he left Astana, and signed with Maccabi Tel Aviv for the rest of the season. With Maccabi, the third club he joined in the 2013–14 season, he became a EuroLeague champion, playing in the role of the team's third string center.

In September 2014, he joined the Italian second division side Credito di Romagna Forli. On 6 January 2015, he left Forli, and signed with Pallacanestro Piacentina of the Italian third division. On 5 March 2015, he parted ways with Piacentina.

In August 2015, he returned to Cibona Zagreb, playing alongside his younger brother, Ante Žižić, in the process.

Croatia national team
Žižić was a member of the senior Croatia national basketball team. He also won a silver medal at the 1998 FIBA Europe Under-18 Championship, and a bronze medal at the 1999 FIBA Under-19 World Championship, while playing with the Croatian national junior teams.

Post-playing career
Shortly after the 2015–16 season ended, Žižić announced his retirement from playing professional basketball, and he became the sporting director for Cibona Zagreb.

Personal life
He is the older brother of the professional basketball player Ante Žižić, who played for the Cleveland Cavaliers of the National Basketball Association (NBA).

References

External links

 Andrija Žižić at aba-liga.com
 Andrija Žižić at nba.com
 Andrija Žižić at archive.fiba.com
 Andrija Žižić at fiba.com
 Andrija Žižić at eurobasket.com
 Andrija Žižić at euroleague.net

1980 births
Living people
ABA League players
ASVEL Basket players
Basket Zaragoza players
Centers (basketball)
BC Astana players
Croatian expatriate basketball people in France
Croatian expatriate basketball people in Spain
Croatian expatriate basketball people in Turkey
Croatian men's basketball players
FC Barcelona Bàsquet players
Fulgor Libertas Forlì players
Galatasaray S.K. (men's basketball) players
KK Cedevita players
KK Cibona players
KK Split players
Liga ACB players
Maccabi Tel Aviv B.C. players
Olympiacos B.C. players
Panathinaikos B.C. players
Power forwards (basketball)
Basketball players from Split, Croatia